Park Chung-hee, the third President of South Korea, was assassinated on October 26, 1979, during a dinner at the Korean Central Intelligence Agency (KCIA) safehouse inside the Blue House presidential compound in Jongno District, Seoul, South Korea. Kim Jae-gyu, the director of the KCIA and the president's security chief, was responsible for the assassination. Park was shot in the chest and the head, and died almost immediately. Four bodyguards and a presidential chauffeur were also killed. The incident is often referred to as "10.26" or the "10.26 incident" in South Korea.

There is a great deal of controversy surrounding Kim's motives, as it remains uncertain whether the act was part of a planned coup d'état or was merely impulsive.

Background

President Park's dictatorship

By the time of his assassination, Park had exercised dictatorial power over South Korea for nearly 18 years.

The Korean Central Intelligence Agency (KCIA) was created in 1961 to coordinate both international and domestic intelligence activities, including those of the military. Almost immediately following its creation, the KCIA was used to suppress any domestic opposition to Park's regime: wiretapping, arresting, and torturing without court order. The KCIA was heavily involved in many behind-the-scenes political maneuvers aimed at weakening the opposition parties through bribing, blackmailing, threatening, or arresting opposing lawmakers. Nevertheless, President Park nearly lost the 1971 presidential election to Kim Dae-jung, despite spending ten percent of the national budget on his election campaign. Park therefore established the Yushin Constitution in 1972 to ensure his perpetual dictatorship. The new constitution replaced direct voting in presidential elections with an indirect voting system involving delegates; allotted one third of the National Assembly seats to the president; repealed presidential term limits; and gave the president the authority to suspend the constitution and issue emergency decrees, appoint all judges, and dismiss the National Assembly. When opposition to the Yushin Constitution arose, Park issued a number of emergency decrees, the first of which made any act of opposition or denial of the Yushin Constitution punishable by imprisonment for up to 15 years.

Despite this, opposition towards Park's rule persisted, and in the 1978 South Korean legislative election, despite Park's Democratic Republican Party (DRP) maintaining a majority, the New Democratic Party (NDP) won the popular vote by a narrow margin, further emboldening them. In September 1979, the courts nullified Kim Young-sam's chairmanship of the NDP and the DRP expelled Kim from the National Assembly in a secret session on October 5, which led all 66 NDP lawmakers to submit their resignations to the National Assembly in protest. The Carter administration in the U.S. recalled its ambassador from Seoul in protest as well. On October 16, when it became known that the government was planning to accept the resignations selectively, democracy protests broke out in Kim's hometown of Busan, the second largest city in South Korea, resulting in arson attacks on 30 police stations over several days. The demonstrations, the largest since the days of President Syngman Rhee, spread to nearby Masan and other cities on October 19, with students and citizens calling for repeal of the Yushin Constitution. The KCIA director, Kim Jae-gyu, went to Busan to investigate the situation and found that the demonstrations were not riots by some college students, but more like a "popular uprising joined by regular citizens" to resist the regime. He warned Park that the uprisings would spread to five other large cities, including Seoul. Park said that he himself would give direct orders to the security forces to fire upon demonstrators if the situation got worse.

Rivalry between Kim Jae-gyu and Cha Ji-chul
While Park faced an increasing opposition to his dictatorship outside Blue House, another kind of conflict was intensifying inside Blue House, between Kim Jae-gyu, who was appointed KCIA Director in December 1976, and Chief Bodyguard Cha Ji-chul, who was appointed to his position in 1974 after Park's wife Yuk Young-soo was killed in an assassination by Mun Se-gwang, an ethnic Korean from Japan.

The rivalry stemmed largely from Cha's increasing encroachment onto KCIA turf and Cha's belittlement of Kim in public. Almost universally disliked yet feared, Cha served Park in close proximity and became his favorite and most trusted advisor. Cha appropriated tanks, helicopters and troops from the Republic of Korea Army, so that the presidential security apparatus essentially had a division under Cha's direct command.

The rivalry between Cha and Kim, whose KCIA was until then the most feared government apparatus, was heightened further by a series of political crises in late 1979, as the two rivals clashed over how to deal with growing opposition to the regime. In the NDP's election of its chairman in 1979, KCIA backed Yi Chul-seung to prevent the election of hardliner Kim Young Sam, but Cha interfered in KCIA's political sabotage with its own behind-scene maneuverings. When Kim Young Sam was elected as the NDP chairman, Cha laid the blame on the KCIA, which infuriated Director Kim.

Later, when Kim Young Sam called on the U.S. to stop supporting Park's regime, in an interview with The New York Times reporter Henry Stokes, Cha pushed for Kim's expulsion from the National Assembly, which Director Kim feared to be a disastrous development, (as it turned out to be true when it led to uprisings in Busan and Masan). Cha easily bested his opponent as his hardline approach was favored by Park, and he blamed worsening developments on Director Kim's weak leadership of the KCIA at every opportunity. As Cha came to control the scheduling of Park's meetings and briefings and thus access to the president, KCIA briefings, which were usually the first business in the morning, were pushed back to afternoons. By October, there were widespread rumors that Kim would soon be replaced as KCIA director.

Assassination

On the day of the assassination, Park and his entourage attended ribbon-cutting ceremonies for a dam in Sapgyo and a KBS TV transmitting station in Dangjin. Director Kim was expected to accompany him since the TV station was under KCIA jurisdiction, but after Cha blocked him from riding in the same helicopter as Park, Director Kim angrily excused himself from the trip.

After the trip, according to KCIA Chief Agent Park Seon-ho, one of the assassination conspirators, Park instructed the KCIA to prepare for one of his numerous banquets, which were held, on average, ten times per month. The banquet was held at a KCIA safehouse inside the Blue House presidential compound.

The banquet was to be attended by Park, Director Kim, Cha, Chief Secretary Kim Gye-won, and two young women – rising singer Sim Soo-bong and a college student named Shin Jae-soon. 15 minutes after Director Kim was notified of the banquet, he called Army Chief of Staff Jeong Seung-hwa, arranging for him to dine with KCIA Deputy Director Kim Jeong-seop in a nearby KCIA building in the same compound.

Just before the dinner, Director Kim told Chief Secretary Kim Gye-won that he would get rid of Cha. It is not clear whether Kim Gye-won misheard, misunderstood, or ignored Kim's words.

During the dinner, volatile political issues, including demonstrations in Busan and the opposition leader Kim Young Sam, were discussed, with Park and Cha taking a hardline, Director Kim calling for moderate measures, while Chief Secretary Kim Gye-won was trying to steer the topic of the discussion to small talk.

Park rebuked Director Kim for not being repressive enough in dealing with protesters and Kim Young Sam, whom Park wanted to have arrested. Each time discussion drifted to other subjects, Cha continued to bring up the inability of KCIA to end the crisis and suggested that demonstrators and opposition lawmakers should be "mowed down with tanks".

The rebukes from Park, and especially Cha, riled Kim, who left the dining room to meet with his closest subordinate, former Marine colonel and KCIA Chief Agent Park Seon-ho, and Army colonel and Director Kim's secretary Park Heung-ju (no relations to the president). Kim said to them: "Chief of Staff and Deputy Director are here as well. Today is the day."

Kim reentered the meeting room with a semi-automatic Walther PPK pistol and opened fire, shooting Cha in the arm and Park in the right chest.  The PPK jammed as he attempted to kill Cha, who fled to a bathroom adjacent to the dining room.  Kim left the room and came back with a Smith & Wesson Model 36 revolver belonging to his subordinate Park Seon-ho.  He killed Cha with a shot to the abdomen before speaking to Park and shooting him in the head execution-style.

Upon hearing the initial shots, Park Seon-ho held two bodyguards in the waiting room at gunpoint and ordered them to put their hands up.  He hoped to prevent further bloodshed, especially since he was a friend of one of the bodyguards, but when the other bodyguard attempted to reach for a gun, Park shot them both dead.  At the same time, Park Heung-ju and two other KCIA agents stormed the kitchen area and killed the remaining bodyguard.

In all, six people were killed: Park, Cha and three presidential bodyguards in the safe house, as well as a presidential chauffeur outside.

Aftermath
After killing Park, Director Kim asked Chief Secretary Kim to secure the safe house and ran to the nearby KCIA building, where Army Chief of Staff Jeong Seung-hwa was waiting. Jeong had heard the shootings and was discussing them with KCIA Deputy Director Kim Jeong-seop when Director Kim came in to tell them that an emergency situation had arisen.

Later, in a car with Jeong Seung-hwa, Kim notified Jeong that Park had died, but without explaining how. Kim hoped that Jeong and Chief Secretary Kim would support him in the coup, as both had been appointed to their positions on his recommendation and Chief Secretary Kim was especially close to Jeong. The car initially headed to KCIA Headquarters, in Namsan district, but eventually went to army headquarters, in Yongsan district, since the army would have to be involved in declaring emergency martial law.

Many historians believe that Kim made a critical mistake in not going to KCIA headquarters, where he would be in control; however, his failure to gain Jeong's support sealed the fate of the conspirators.

Meanwhile, Chief Secretary Kim took Park's body to the Army hospital and ordered doctors to save him at all costs (without revealing Park's identity). He then went to Prime Minister Choi Kyu-hah to reveal what happened that night.

When Chief of Staff Jeong learned of what happened from Chief Secretary Kim, he ordered Major General Chun Doo-hwan, commander of Security Command, to take Director Kim into custody and investigate the incident.

Director Kim was arrested after he was lured to a secluded area outside army headquarters on the pretext of meeting with Jeong. Eventually, everyone involved in the assassination was arrested, tortured and later executed. In the process, Chun Doo-hwan emerged as a new political force by investigating and subordinating KCIA under his Security Command, and Jeong Seung-hwa became the chief martial law administrator.  Later, when Chun Doo-hwan seized power in the Coup d'état of December Twelfth 1979, he had Jeong Seung-hwa and Chief Secretary Kim arrested on suspicion of conspiring with Director Kim.

Theories regarding motive

Kim Jae-kgyu's motive in killing his long-time benefactor President Park has been controversial and the subject of much discussion. There are many theories on Kim's true motive of killing Park. The following are just some of these theories.

The killing was an unplanned, impulsive act
One theory is that it was an unplanned, impulsive act. 
 For several months, Kim had been under extreme pressure from a series of political crises.  In addition, Cha had been aggressively encroaching on KCIA's turf and Park had been showing an increasing preference for Cha over Kim.  During the dinner Cha and Park severely criticized Kim for incompetence— this was the straw that broke the camel's back. 
 Kim did not have a gun hidden and ready in the same building— he had to go to another building to get a gun.
 Kim told his closest subordinates nothing about his plans until just before he acted.  Park Seun-ho later regretted that Kim hadn't given him enough information to handle the aftermath more effectively at KCIA.
 Kim had virtually no plan for the aftermath of Park's assassination.
 Kim went to Army HQ instead of KCIA HQ.

The killing was deliberate and premeditated 
One theory is that Kim deliberately planned the assassination of Park.
 Kim invited the Army Chief of Staff to a dinner at 4:15 pm, after learning that he would have a dinner with Park at 4:00 pm. Kim appears to have decided on the assassination at 4:15 pm at the latest.
 It was not customary for Kim to carry a gun to dinner with Park.
 Kim claimed that he had wanted to end Park's dictatorship ever since the Yushin Constitution was ratified in 1972. He claimed that he had attempted to assassinate Park three times: once in 1974 and twice in 1979. He told his lawyer that his first attempt to assassinate Park was on September 14, 1974, when he was appointed to be Minister of Construction. A newsreel of this event does show something protruding out of Kim's pocket when he shook hands with Park.
 In April 1979, Kim invited the three Chiefs of Staff (of the Republic of Korea Army, Navy and Air Force) to a dinner similar to the dinner of the day of assassination. Kim, however, called off that assassination plan.
 Shortly before the dinner banquet, Kim told Chief Secretary Kim Gye-won that he would get rid of Cha. 
 Kim was not entirely wrong in reading the mood of the military and of Army Chief of Staff Jeong Seung-hwa.  During Kim's trial, Jeong said that Park's regime acted wrongly in some cases, quoted some of Kim's statements word-for-word, and appeared to defend Kim's actions. After the assassination, 50 out of 52 generals in the military voted to repeal the Yushin Constitution.  Although the military dictatorship continued under Chun Doo-hwan, the Yushin Constitution was repealed a year later, on October 27, 1980.
 The main proponents of the theory that the assassination was unplanned were Kim Gye-won and Jeong Seung-hwa, who had a vested interest in portraying the event as an impulsive act, as they were both suspected of being co-conspirators.

The killing was motivated by jealousy of Cha 

One theory is that Kim assassinated Park out of jealousy toward Cha, when he was losing his status and power as No. 2 in Park's regime. 
 
 When Kim shot Park, his rallying cry was not about democracy but rather reflected his resentment of Cha.
 Kim worked tirelessly to sabotage the opposition party's election and prevent Kim Young Sam's chairmanship.
 As Kim testified in his trial, his relationship with Park was one of real brothers. They came from the same hometown and were classmates at the South Korean Army Academy.

The killing was motivated by a desire to restore democracy 
One theory is that Kim assassinated Park in an attempt to restore democracy.

 In his last statement at his trial, Kim gave five motives for assassinating Park: "firstly, to restore free democracy; secondly, to prevent further bloodshed of Korean people; thirdly, to prevent North Korean aggression; fourthly, to completely restore the close relationship with our strong ally the United States, which fell to the worst point since the founding of South Korea and advance our national interest through closer cooperation in defense, diplomacy, and economy; and fifthly, to restore [South] Korea's honor in the international community by cleansing the bad image of [South] Korea as a dictatorship country."
 Kim said in court: "I shot the heart of Yushin in the heart of [the] beast. I did that for [the] democracy of this country. There [was] no ambition and greed."
 According to people close to Kim, in the 1971 presidential election, at Kim's suggestion, Park promised voters that it would be his last term. Kim was very disappointed when Park broke his promise and ratified the Yushin Constitution, which guaranteed Park's dictatorship for life.
 According to people who were Kim's subordinates when he was the commander of Third Army Group in 1972, Kim was very disturbed by the Yushin Constitution. Kim claimed that if Park were to visit his base during a tour of military bases, he planned to arrest Park and force him to resign.  A small house on the base would be used to detain Park, and the wire fence surrounding the house was indeed modified to permit entry but prevent exit.
Declassified U.S. diplomatic cables revealed that Kim was thought of as an unusual KCIA director who often spoke of democracy and as a more approachable figures who often carried Washington's messages on human rights to Park. 
Long after Kim's death, it was revealed that he had maintained contacts with opposition leaders. Respected opposition leader Jang Jun-ha felt that Kim was a patriotic soldier who would one day work with them for democracy. According to Jang's eldest son, the two would pretend to run into each other accidentally when they met, and Kim secretly helped Jang's family financially. In 1975, Jang died under suspicious circumstance while climbing a mountain.  Later, when Kim was KCIA director, he met Jang's son to tell him with deep regret that Jang's death was not accidental but that the regime was involved.
 Kim asked a relative, a consul serving in Japan, to draft a "third way"— a way to amend the Yushin Constitution that would allow Park to maintain military power but yield political power to a civilian government.  According to Cardinal Kim Sou-hwan, Director Kim once asked him to talk to Park about a "third way"— a way to amend the Yushin Constitution that would be acceptable to Park.  Director Kim believed that as a Catholic cardinal, Cardinal Kim was the only person who could speak frankly to Park without repercussion.  He was disappointed when the talk proved fruitless.
In 1979, Kim often wrote calligraphy about freedom and democracy, which were found in his house after his arrest.
 One argument against the theory that Kim was acting out of a love of democracy is the fact that the KCIA's chief function was to maintain Park's dictatorship by suppressing opposition parties, democracy activists, leftist students, and intellectuals. In his capacity as KCIA director, Kim used all of the KCIA's tools of repression, including torture, unlawful imprisonment, and murder.  In light of his actions as director of KCIA, it is difficult to believe that Kim was a closeted believer in democracy, although it is possible that he tried to be a mitigating influence on Park and KCIA.

Possible American Central Intelligence Agency involvement
 One theory is that the American Central Intelligence Agency (CIA) was behind the assassination of Park. According to this theory, the CIA wanted to prevent the development of a nuclear weapon by South Korea, something that Park was pursuing. Later the United States recognized Chun Doo-hwan's legitimacy on the condition of his abandoning the nuclear weapons program.   
 Kim claimed that the United States was behind him. The United States Ambassador denied any American involvement in his diplomatic cable to the State Department. Diplomatic cables show that Ambassador William H. Gleysteen worried about the possibility of Kim claiming that he and his predecessor incited Kim to assassinate Park. In any case, it is possible that Kim believed that his coup would have the support of the United States if successful. In 1999, Gleysteen said that the U.S. became unwittingly involved in Park's assassination without explaining further. 
 Kim had frequent meetings with Robert G. Brewster, CIA chief in Seoul, and other American diplomats. He met with Ambassador Gleysteen on the day of the assassination, just five hours before the shooting.
 Kim cited the worsening American–South Korean diplomatic relations as one of his reasons for assassinating Park.
 Another theory is that Kim was protected by the CIA and was even seen alive after his "alleged" execution. However, this claim is not widely believed.

Other motives
 Kim deliberately assassinated Park in an effort to seize power for himself. This was the official determination of Chun Doo-hwan's investigation. 
 Kim suffered from temporary insanity due to hepatic encephalopathy related to his liver disease. However, his physician Kim Jeong-Ryong stated that Kim's liver disease was well controlled and not serious enough to affect daily activities.
 A combination of factors led to the assassination—Kim had planned to assassinate Park but the actual assassination was an impulsive act provoked by the behavior of Cha.

Fate of KCIA conspirators

Park Heung-ju, Kim Jae-gyu's secretary and former aide-de-camp of Kim, was executed by firing squad on March 6, 1980: he was executed first because he was on active military service at the time of the assassination.

Five men were hanged  on May 24, 1980:
 Kim Jae-gyu, KCIA chief and assassin of President Park.
 Park Seon-ho, senior KCIA agent and pupil of Kim Jae-gyu when the latter was a middle school teacher.
 Yoo Seong-ok, a driver in the KCIA safehouse.
 Lee Ki-ju, head of the safehouse security service.
 Kim Tae-won, safehouse security agent: while he did not actually kill anyone, he was heavily involved in the planning, and after the assassination (on Park Seon-ho's orders), he fired an automatic rifle into the safehouse in an attempt to disguise the shooting as an ambush by North Korean commandos.

Seo Young-jun, a safehouse security agent, was released after serving 17 years of a sentence of life imprisonment.

Except for Park Heung-ju and Park Seon-ho, the co-conspirators followed Kim Jae-gyu's orders without knowing whom they were shooting and why.

Witnesses
 Kim Gye-won: chief secretary
 Sim Soo-bong: famous female singer
 Shin Jae-soon: a female student of Hanyang University

See also
 The President's Last Bang: a 2005 black comedy film satirizing the event
 The Man Standing Next: a 2020 political drama film
 Blue House Raid

References

External links
 BBC News' "On this day": a recollection of Park's assassination.
 Korea Now video regarding the assassination

Park Chung-hee
1970s in Seoul
1979 murders in South Korea
Assassinated South Korean politicians
Assassinations in South Korea
Korean Central Intelligence Agency
October 1979 events in Asia
Mass shootings in South Korea